Balneum is a monotypic genus of bush crickets in the subfamily Phaneropterinae; the single species Balneum bivittatum Piza, 1967 is found in E. Brasil.

References

Phaneropterinae
Tettigoniidae genera
Monotypic Orthoptera genera